Francis Harvey (1611–1703) was an English lawyer and politician who sat in the House of Commons  at various times between 1656 and 1661.

Harvey was the son of William Harvey of Weston Favell, Northamptonshire and was baptised on 20 December 1611. He matriculated at St Edmund Hall, Oxford on 19 October 1627, aged 14 and was awarded  B.A. on 11 June 1629. He was called to the bar at Middle Temple in 1637.

In 1656, Harvey was elected Member of Parliament for Northampton in the Second Protectorate Parliament. He was re-elected MP for Northampton in 1659 for the Third Protectorate Parliament.

In 1660, Harvey was elected  MP for Northampton in the Convention Parliament but was unseated on petition on 21 Jun 1660. He was re-elected in 1661 for the Cavalier Parliament in a double return. He was seated on 22 May 1661,but the election was  declared void on 13 Jun 1661. He was treasurer of his Inn in 1667.

Harvey died at the age of  91. He was buried in the Temple church on 30 March 1703.

Harvey married Elizabeth Dickens, widow of St. Olave, Hart Street, London in 1665.

References

 

 

1611 births
1703 deaths
Members of the Middle Temple
Alumni of St Edmund Hall, Oxford
People from Northampton
English MPs 1656–1658
English MPs 1659
English MPs 1660
English MPs 1661–1679